NovaBay Pharmaceuticals, Inc. is an Emeryville, California based clinical-stage biopharmaceutical company, focused on developing novel, fast-acting, synthetic anti-infectives compounds. These compounds are designed to mimic the body's defense system against infection. The company is currently focused on products for the eye care market. Major products include Avenova, cleared by FDA for lid and lash cleansing as part of a regimen for Blepharitis.
and  NeutroPhase, used in treatment of Necrotizing Fasciitis

History

NovaBay Pharmaceuticals, Inc. was founded by Ron Najafi, an organic chemist who had previously worked for several pharmaceutical, chemical, and biotech companies in the U.S.  Najafi became intrigued by HOCl, hypochlorous acid, an antimicrobial substance produced by White Blood Cells while investigating the chemical reaction of White Blood Cells during oxidative burst cycle.  HOCl and other chlorine-containing chemicals fight invading microbes. These natural substances rapidly oxidize the cell walls of bacteria and the protein coats of viruses, rendering them inactive.

Najafi started NovaBay Pharmaceuticals in 2000 to create a stable version of HOCl. Najafi, chemistry Nobel laureate Herbert C. Brown, and Purdue University Professor Dale Margerum recruited Dr. Lu Wang to NovaBay, where she is now Director of Product Development. She was able to develop the stable version of pure hypochlorous acid, without bleach impurities, which became NovaBay's first product, NeutroPhase and cleared by the Food and Drug Administration in 2010.

The product successfully treats a variety of chronic non-healing wounds without the use of standard antibiotics. NovaBay announced two new products named CelleRx™ for Plastic Surgery and i-Lid™ Cleanser (Now Avenova) that was cleared by FDA for lid and lash cleansing as part of a regimen for Blepharitis.

Corporate Governance
, the members of the board of directors of NovaBay Pharmaceuticals were: Mark Sieczkarek, Paul E. Freiman, Paul Li, Gail Maderis, Yonghao (Carl) Ma, Todd Zavodnick, Mijia (Bob) Wu and Xiaoyan (Henry) Liu.

Products

Products on the market
Avenova (formerly known as i-Lid Cleanser) 
NeutroPhase 
CelleRx, for Plastic Surgery

Products under development
NovaBay developed a method for making a stable pure form of hypochlorous acid (HOCl), a substance produced by the immune system as an effective first defense against microbial invaders. The company calls their proprietary formulation Neutrox. The company's chemists also created a related family of compounds which the company calls  Aganocides.

The company is currently developing compounds with anti-bacterial and anti-viral action. Potential applications include flesh-eating disease, problems related to in-dwelling urinary catheters, and common eye conditions.
Compounds are also being developed for the veterinary market.

References

External links

NovaBay Pharmaceuticals, Inc., "The New York Times"

Companies listed on NYSE American
Pharmaceutical companies of the United States
Companies based in Emeryville, California
Technology companies based in the San Francisco Bay Area
Health care companies based in California